Abraham van Dijck (June 1635 in Amsterdam – 27 August 1680 in Dordrecht), was a Dutch Golden Age painter.

Biography 
According to the RKD he was a Rembrandt pupil based on the style Rembrandt was using in the 1650s. His earliest works are dated 1655. Though he is registered as working in Dordrecht and clearly was in Amsterdam, he is also registered in Alkmaar in 1659. Besides Rembrandt, his works show the influence of Gabriël Metsu, Caspar Netscher and Quiringh Gerritsz van Brekelenkam.

There is a fine painting by Abraham Van Dijk in the Brigham Young University Museum of Art in Provo, Utah ("Tobias Leaving His Parents").

Works

References

External links 

Abraham van Dijck on Artnet

1635 births
1680 deaths
Dutch Golden Age painters
Dutch male painters
Painters from Amsterdam
Pupils of Rembrandt